= Escadre =

The French language term escadre refers to a naval or military aviation unit equivalent to the English language terms :

- squadron (naval)
- wing (air force) (e.g. United States Air Force)
- group (air force) (e.g. Royal Air Force)
